Scoliopus bigelovii is a species of flowering plant in the lily family known by several common names, including California fetid adderstongue, Bigelow's adderstongue, slinkpod, and brownies. It is native to California, where it is known from the Santa Cruz Mountains, parts of the San Francisco Bay Area and North Coast Ranges. It has also been collected just over the border in Oregon. It occurs in old-growth forest in the understory of redwoods. It grows in mossy, moist places, often in shade.

This herbaceous perennial, one of two species of Scoliopus, grows from a rhizome and a small section of underground stem. There are sometimes 3 or 4 leaves. They have several longitudinal veins and are green with darker green or purplish mottling. The inflorescence is actually an umbel of flowers, but the peduncle is mostly underground with 3 to 12 flower-bearing pedicels rising above the surface, appearing separate. The flower has three flat, spreading, pointed oval or lance-shaped sepals and three narrower, linear or fingerlike petals. The sepals are pale or greenish and striped or streaked with dark purple. The flower has a disagreeable scent. The three short stamens are located at the bases of the sepals. The style has three long, often curving branches. The fruit is a capsule. As it matures, the pedicel that bears it twists or droops down to bring it in contact with the substrate.

The flower is pollinated by fungus gnats of the genera Mycetophilla, Sciara, and Corynoptera. Seeds are dispersed by ants, including Formica fusca, Formica rufibaris, and Aphaenogaster subterranea.

References

External links
Jepson Manual Treatment
USDA Plants Profile
Flora of North America
Photo gallery

Liliaceae
Flora of Oregon
Flora of California
Plants described in 1857
Flora without expected TNC conservation status